Gordon Backlund (born November 11, 1940) is an American politician and former engineer who served as a member of the Minnesota House of Representatives from 1985 to 1986.

Early life and education 
Backlund was born in Saint Paul, Minnesota. He graduated from Two Harbors High School in Two Harbors, Minnesota. Backlund received a Bachelor of Science degree in electrical engineering from the University of Minnesota and his Master of Public Administration from the University of Iowa.

Career 
Backlund worked for Collins Radio Company in Cedar Rapids, Iowa. He served in the Minnesota House of Representatives in 1985 and 1986 and was a Republican. In 1989, Backlund served on the Fridley School Board.

Personal life

Backlund lived in Fridley, Minnesota. Backlund and his wife, Linda, had two children. His son, Mark, died in January 2008, at age 29, after a traffic accident. Mark was tasered by Minnesota State Patrol troopers after being "uncooperative and combative." State troopers were cleared of any wrongdoing in the incident.

His brother-in-law, Daniel Knuth, and his niece, Kate Knuth, also served in the Minnesota Legislature.

Notes

1940 births
Living people
People from Fridley, Minnesota
Politicians from Saint Paul, Minnesota
American electrical engineers
University of Iowa alumni
University of Minnesota College of Science and Engineering alumni
School board members in Minnesota
Republican Party members of the Minnesota House of Representatives